Aastha Kunj is a 200-acre park in southeast New Delhi, India. It lies between the Lotus Temple, ISKCON Temple, Nehru Place. Nearest metro station to reach here are Kalka ji mandir metro station, Nehru Place metro station. Good for jogging and exercise and along with that you can play various types of sports.

References

Parks in Delhi